No 606 (Chiltern) Squadron was formed as a Royal Auxiliary Air Force helicopter support squadron in 1996 at RAF Benson and gaining its official number three years later on 1 October 1999. It provides personnel for the RAF tactical support helicopter fleet and does not operate any aircraft itself.

History
The squadron code ‘BG’ was allocated to No 606 Squadron RAuxAF in 1939, but it was never activated during the Second World War.

Since its reformation in 1996, personnel from the squadron have deployed on Operations across the globe including Afghanistan, the Falkland Islands, Cyprus and Iraq.

References

External links
 Squadron history on the official RAF website
 History of No.'s 605–610 Squadrons at RAF Web
 Current page on RAF Reserves website

606
Military units and formations established in 1999
1999 establishments in the United Kingdom